Presidential elections were held in Ivory Coast on 25 October 2015. Alassane Ouattara won a second term in a landslide victory over his closest rival Pascal Affi N'Guessan.

Campaign
The President of the Ivory Coast is elected with a five-year mandate through a two-round system, with 50% simple majority required to avoid a run-off. According to the 2000 Constitution of Ivory Coast, candidates are limited to two consecutive terms as president. Incumbent President Alassane Ouattara, first elected in 2010 preceding the 2010–11 Ivorian crisis, stood again to seek a second term.

Opposition party Ivorian Popular Front (FPI) called for a boycott of the elections in protest against the trial of former President Laurent Gbagbo by the International Criminal Court. Presidential candidate Pascal Affi N'Guessan denounced the incarceration of Gbagbo and political conditions under Ouattara:

Some hardliners in the FPI did not want to participate in elections as long as Gbagbo remained imprisoned, but others felt the party needed to remain engaged in the electoral process.

Results
The vote was relatively peaceful, compared to the unrest that marred previous elections, although voter turnout was down to 54.6%. Outtara avoided a second round vote and won a second term in office after garnering 83.7%, in a landslide victory over his nearest rival Affi N'Guessan on 9.3%.

References

Ivory
General election
Presidential elections in Ivory Coast